Andy Pirki is an Indian slapstick comedy animated television series produced by AUM Animation Studios (formerly Bluepixels Animation Studios). It premiered on 3 December 2017 on Pogo.

It showcases the story of a pink dinosaur and a caveman, who are best friends.

Characters

Andy
Andy is a pink dinosaur who is the only remaining member of his species that became extinct when he was very young. He was feeling lonely and cast-out. But then he found Pirki and they became friends.

Pirki
Pirki is a human who was separated from the human world when he was a child in a sailing mishap. Andy found him and they became friends.

Accolades

References 

2017 Indian television series debuts
2017 Indian television seasons
2018 Indian television seasons
Indian children's animated comedy television series
Pogo (TV channel) original programming
Animated television series about dinosaurs
Television series set in prehistory